Dmitri Anatolyevich Afanasenkov (born May 12, 1980) is a Russian former professional ice hockey player who played in the National Hockey League (NHL) with the Tampa Bay Lightning and the Philadelphia Flyers.

Playing career
Afanasenkov began his North American ice hockey career after being drafted by the Tampa Bay Lightning in the 1998 NHL Entry Draft in the third round, 72nd overall. He started playing in the Quebec Major Junior Hockey League (QMJHL) for the Moncton Wildcats in his first season, and then for the Sherbrooke Castors in the 1999–2000 and 2000–01 seasons.

Following the 2000–01 season, he was signed by the Lightning. Until the 2003–04 NHL season, he would split his time between the Lightning and their farm team. He would play for one IHL team (the Detroit Vipers) and two AHL teams (the Grand Rapids Griffins and Springfield Falcons).

During the 2003–04 NHL season, his rookie season, he scored six goals and ten assists during the regular season and three points during the Lightning's post season run to the 2004 Stanley Cup.

Following the lockout, he returned to the Lightning, but with the presence of Vincent Lecavalier, Martin St. Louis, and Brad Richards, he had limited playing time. He did not put up the numbers he could, and so, on December 30, 2006, the Lightning waived him and he was picked up by the Philadelphia Flyers. While in Philadelphia, Afanasenkov picked up the nickname "The Shark", scoring 15 points (8 goals, 7 assists) in 41 games with the Flyers. A pending restricted free agent, he was not tendered a qualifying offer and became an unrestricted free agent. He signed with Dynamo Moscow on August 1, 2007 and signed on 26 September 2009 for Lokomotiv Yaroslavl.

Career statistics

Regular season and playoffs

International

Awards and honours

References

External links
 

1980 births
Avtomobilist Yekaterinburg players
Detroit Vipers players
HC Dynamo Moscow players
HC Fribourg-Gottéron players
HK Gomel players
Grand Rapids Griffins players
EHC Kloten players
HC Lada Togliatti players
Living people
Lokomotiv Yaroslavl players
Moncton Wildcats players
Sportspeople from Arkhangelsk
Philadelphia Flyers players
Russian ice hockey left wingers
Sherbrooke Castors players
Springfield Falcons players
Stanley Cup champions
Tampa Bay Lightning draft picks
Tampa Bay Lightning players
Traktor Chelyabinsk players